Murray Thomas Batchelor (born 27 August 1961) is an Australian mathematical physicist. He is best known for his work in mathematical physics and theoretical physics.

Academic career
Batchelor was educated at Chatham Public School and Chatham High School (Taree, New South Wales). He completed an Honours degree in Theoretical Physics at the University of New South Wales in 1983, graduating with 1st class honours and a University Medal. Batchelor completed a PhD in Mathematics at the Australian National University in 1987.

His first postdoctoral research position was at the Lorentz Institute in Leiden. After a time as a postdoctoral research fellow in mathematics at the University of Melbourne he took up an Australian Research Council QEII Fellowship at the Australian National University. He then was awarded two successive ARC Senior Research Fellowships, followed by an ARC Professorial Fellowship in 2003.

Batchelor served as Head of the Department of Theoretical Physics from mid-2005 to March 2013. He has held visiting positions at a number of universities, including the University of Oxford, the University of Tokyo and Institut Henri Poincaré. He held a Visiting Fellowship at All Souls College, Oxford during Michaelmas Term 2013.

During his career, Batchelor has published over 150 peer-reviewed papers. He is a Fellow of the Australian Mathematical Society, the Australian Institute of Physics and the Institute of Physics (UK).

Batchelor was Editor-in-Chief of Journal of Physics A: Mathematical and Theoretical. Prior to this he served as Mathematical Physics Section Editor (2007–2008) and as a member of the Editorial Board (2005–2006). He is currently Topical Reviews Editor (2014-).

In 2008 Batchelor was awarded an Honorary Professorship at Chongqing University, China. He took up a full-time position there in 2013 under the 1000 Talents Plan. He is a General Council Member of the Asia-Pacific Center for Theoretical Physics.

He holds a part-time position at the Australian National University jointly between the Department of Theoretical Physics in the Research School of Physics and Engineering and the Mathematical Sciences Institute.

However, Batchelor has also shown an interest in ancient and modern stromatolites, which has led him on a number of field trips to outback Australia, including to the Pilbara Craton and to Hamelin Pool Marine Nature Reserve.

In 2018 he led research into the stones used to build Buckingham Palace, determining that they were made from 200 million year old microbes.

Public roles

Batchelor served on the Mathematical and Information Sciences and Technology Assessment Panel for the Australian Research Quality Framework (2007).

Awards

 University Medal, UNSW - 1983
 Pawsey Medal, Australian Academy of Science - 1997
 Australian Mathematical Society Medal - 1998
 ARC Professorial Fellowship - 2003
 Visiting Fellowship, All Souls College - 2013
 1000 Talent Professor, China - 2013

Selected bibliography

References

External links
 Personal home page (ANU)
 Journal of Physics A: Mathematical and Theoretical

Academic staff of the Australian National University
Mathematical physicists
Australian physicists
Living people
1961 births
People from Taree
University of New South Wales alumni
Theoretical physicists
Fellows of the Australian Institute of Physics
Australian National University alumni